Lipinia auriculata, also known as the Taylor's lipinia, is a species of skink. It is endemic to the Philippines.

References

Lipinia
Reptiles of the Philippines
Endemic fauna of the Philippines
Reptiles described in 1917
Taxa named by Edward Harrison Taylor